Turbonilla obliquata is a species of sea snail, a marine gastropod mollusk in the family Pyramidellidae, the pyrams and their allies.

Description
The length of the hyaline shell measures 3 mm. The teleoconch contains nine convex whorls with about 14 oblique small ribs and much wider, smooth interspaces.

Distribution
This marine species occurs in the following locations:
 European waters (ERMS scope): France, Spain, Portugal
 Mediterranean Sea: Greece
 Atlantic Ocean: the Azores.

References

External links
 To Biodiversity Heritage Library (14 publications)
 To CLEMAM
 To Encyclopedia of Life
 To World Register of Marine Species
 

obliquata
Gastropods described in 1844